is an annual manga and anime fan convention in Tokyo, Japan. it is organized by Shueisha, publisher of the various Jump anthologies which are Weekly Shōnen Jump, Jump Square, V Jump, Saikyō Jump and Shōnen Jump+. The exposition was started in 1999, and is held for two days in December with over 100,000 people attending every year. New manga, anime, films, games, and merchandise are introduced during this event. Manga artists of popular current and former Jump series are often on hand, and many of them have panels where they answer questions. The festival's mascot is named  and was designed by Akira Toriyama.

Although the focus of the event is around Shueisha's Jump properties, game designers, such as Bandai Namco Entertainment, Capcom, and Square Enix, have attended the event and announced new games and debuted trailers, gameplay footage, and game demos.

Event history

References

External links

Official Jump Festa site 

Anime conventions in Japan
Gaming conventions
Video game trade shows
Book fairs in Japan
Autumn events in Japan
Winter events in Japan